Rätsepa is a village in Põhja-Pärnumaa Parish, Pärnu County, Estonia, on the southern outskirts of the borough of Vändra.

References

 

Villages in Pärnu County